Tropicimonas arenosa is a Gram-negative, aerobic, rod-shaped and non-motile bacterium from the genus of Tropicimonas which has been isolated from sand from the Jeju island in Korea.

References

External links
Type strain of Tropicimonas arenosa at BacDive -  the Bacterial Diversity Metadatabase

Rhodobacteraceae
Bacteria described in 2016